James fitz Maurice FitzGerald, de jure 12th Earl of Desmond (died 1540), also counted 13th, was called Court Page as he grew up as a hostage for his grandfather Thomas FitzGerald, 11th Earl of Desmond, the Bald, at the court of Henry VIII. He should have succeeded this grandfather in 1534, but John FitzGerald, de facto 12th Earl of Desmond usurped the earldom and was followed in 1536 by his son James, fitz John. In 1539 the lord deputy of Ireland, Leonard Grey seized some Desmond land in southern County Cork and handed it to Court Page, who came to Ireland to claim his rights but was killed by Maurice fitz John FitzGerald, called Totane. He was succeeded by James fitz John, now rightful 13th earl.

Birth and origins 
James was born the only son of Maurice fitz Thomas FitzGerald and his wife Joan FitzGibbon. His father was the only son of Thomas FitzGerald, 11th Earl of Desmond, called the Bald, but predeceased him. His father's family, the FitzGeralds of Desmond, were a noble cadet branch of the Old English Geraldines, of which the FitzGeralds of Kildare were the senior branch.

James's mother was a daughter of John fitz Gerald FitzGibbon, the white knight.

James had a sister, Ellen, who married Thomas Butler, 1st Baron Cahir as his second wife.

Marriage and child 
FitzGerald married Mary, eldest daughter of Cormac Laidir Oge MacCarthy, 10th Lord of Muskerry.

James and Mary had an only daughter:
Judith who died unmarried in 1565

His widow married Daniel O'Sullivan Mor.

Later life 
Upon the death in 1634 of his grandfather Thomas FitzGerald, 11th Earl of Desmond, called the Bald, Court Page should have succeeded as the 12th earl of Desmond, but he was absent in London. His right to the title was disputed by his granduncle John FitzGerald. When John died in 1536, his son James, fitz John continued in the claim to the earldom.

Court Page came or was sent to Ireland in 1539 after Leonard Grey, Lord Deputy of Ireland helped by James Butler, 9th Earl of Ormond had seized the Desmond territories of Imokilly and Kerrycurrihy in southern Cork.

Death and timeline 
on 19 March 1540 Court Page was killed by his cousin, Maurice fitz John FitzGerald, called Totane, brother of James FitzGerald, 13th Earl of Desmond. Court Page is reported to have died at a place called Leacan Sgail in County Kerry that does not seem to have been identified.

Notes and references

Notes

Citations

Sources 

 
  – Bass to Canning (for Cahir)
  – Dacre to Dysart (for Desmond)
  – (for timeline)
 
  – "Court Page"
 
 

15th-century Irish people
16th-century Irish people
1540 deaths
Earls of Desmond (1329 creation)
John
Normans in Ireland
People of the Tudor period
Year of birth unknown